The 1957 Wyoming Cowboys football team was an American football team that represented the University of Wyoming as a member of the Skyline Conference during the 1957 NCAA University Division football season. In their first season under head coach Bob Devaney, the Cowboys compiled a 4–3–3 record (3–2–2 against Skyline opponents), finished fourth in the Skyline Conference, and outscored opponents by a total of 139 to 135.

The 1957 season was Bob Devaney's first as a head coach. He was later inducted into the College Football Hall of Fame.

Schedule

References

Wyoming
Wyoming Cowboys football seasons
Wyoming Cowboys football